Middle Palisade is a 14,018-foot (4,273 meters) peak in the central Sierra Nevada mountain range in the U.S. state of California. It is a fourteener, and lies on the Sierra Crest as part of the Palisades group, a group of prominent Sierra Nevada mountain summits that includes multiple other fourteeners, approximately 12 miles southwest of the town of Big Pine. Middle Palisade is the twelfth highest peak in California.

Middle Palisade's eastern flank hosts the Middle Palisade Glacier, lying above the South Fork of Big Pine Creek. To the west of Middle Palisade are the Palisade Lakes, Palisade Creek, and the John Muir Trail as it ascends south towards Mather Pass.

Several routes involving exposed scrambling  and/or easy technical rock climbing exist on the various flanks of Middle Palisade. Some routes involve travel on the Middle Palisade Glacier. The easiest route involves scrambling up a chute on the east face of the peak.

See also
 List of California fourteeners
 The Palisades of the Sierra Nevada
 Disappointment Peak

References

External links
 

Fourteeners of California
Mountains of Kings Canyon National Park
Mountains of the John Muir Wilderness
Mountains of Fresno County, California
Mountains of Inyo County, California
Mountains of Northern California